Lu Zhengyao (陸正耀) aka Charles Lu (born 1969/1970) is a Chinese businessman, angel investor, and the non-executive chairman of Luckin Coffee, a coffee shop chain in China. Lu earned a degree in industrial electric automation from the University of Science and Technology Beijing in 1991, and an EMBA degree from Peking University in 2010.

Lu was an early investor in Luckin Coffee. In mid-April 2020, American investment bank Goldman Sachs announced that it would seize and sell Zhengyao's Luckin stock holdings after he defaulted on a corporate margin loan.

Lu also owns about 33 percent of Car Inc, a Hong Kong-listed car rental company.

References

Living people
Former billionaires
Chinese chairpersons of corporations
University of Science and Technology Beijing alumni
Peking University alumni
Year of birth missing (living people)